HTC RE refers to a series of products made by HTC, including the RE Camera camera device, Vive virtual-reality headset, and the Grip fitness tracker.

References 

HTC computer peripherals